The Oberliga Hamburg, sometimes referred to as Hamburg-Liga, is the highest league in the German state of Hamburg, incorporating some of its surrounding districts. It is one of fourteen Oberligen in German football, the fifth tier of the German football league system.

Overview

1945–1963
The league was re-formed in 1945 as Stadtliga Hamburg (English: Hamburg City League) by thirteen clubs, in the newly recreated state of Hamburg which was then part of the British occupation zone in Germany. The very first league in the Hamburg & Altona area had been inaugurated as early as 1895.

In its first two seasons, the league was actually the first tier of the German league system for Hamburg, holding clubs like the Hamburger SV and FC St. Pauli in its ranks.

From 1947, the Hamburg-Liga was a feeder league to the Oberliga Nord which its champion had the option of promotion to. Promotion had to be achieved through a play-off with teams from the Amateurligen of Lower Saxony, Bremen and Schleswig-Holstein. As such, the league was by then the second tier of the northern German league system. The league was renamed Verbandsliga Hamburg (English: Hamburg FA League), and split into two groups of ten teams, the Alsterstaffel and Elbestaffel, named after the two main rivers in Hamburg. The top four clubs of the 1946–47 season left the league for the new Oberliga Nord, those clubs being the Hamburger SV, FC St. Pauli, Concordia Hamburg and Victoria Hamburg. Traditionally, the league also accommodated clubs from neighboring Lower Saxony and Schleswig-Holstein (which it still does today), like Lüneburger SK and VfL Stade.

The two divisions were increased in strength to twelve clubs each in 1949. The year after, the league was reunited in one single division with sixteen clubs. It received the new name of Amateurliga Hamburg. The league operated on a strength of sixteen for most of the coming seasons.

1963–1974
In 1963, with the introduction of the Bundesliga, the disbanding of the Oberliga Nord and the formation of the Regionalliga Nord, the league fell to tier three and was again renamed, now Landesliga Hamburg (English:Hamburg State League), but remained unchanged otherwise, with sixteen clubs as its strength. The champion of Hamburg continued to have to play-off for promotion, now to the Regionalliga, with the same opposition as before.

From 1970, the number of leagues below the Hamburg–Liga was reduced from three to two, resulting in the Hammonia-Staffel and Hansa-Staffel which still exist today, first at the name of Verbandsliga, then, from 1978, as Landesliga.

1974–1994
After the 1973–74 season, the Regionalliga Nord was disbanded in favor of the 2nd Bundesliga Nord. The new Oberliga Nord was now introduced in northern Germany, as the third tier of the league system, below the 2nd Bundesliga. This meant for the Landesliga a slip to tier four. The top two teams of the league were however promoted to the new Oberliga. The system for promotion from the league remained mostly unchanged with an ongoing play-off system that saw the top two teams from Hamburg qualified for it.

In 1978, the league went through another name change, this time reverting to Verbandsliga Hamburg.

1994–2008
In 1994, the Regionalliga Nord was re-established, now as the third tier of the league system. The Oberliga Nord was in turn replaced by two parallel Oberligen, Niedersachsen/Bremen and Hamburg/Schleswig-Holstein. For the Verbandsliga Hamburg, this meant a further slip, now to tier five, but also, for the first time in its history, direct promotion for the league champion. Along with its champion being promoted to the new Regionalliga, the league also saw the clubs placed two to eight elevated to the Oberliga.

The 1999–2000 season saw another league system change with the reduction of numbers of Regionalligen, this however had only one effect on the Verbandsliga, no promotion was available this year.

In 2004, it was decided to restore the Oberliga Nord in favor of the two separate Oberligen.

The 2006–07 league winner, SC Victoria Hamburg, did not apply for an Oberliga licence and was not promoted.

2008–present
At the end of the 2007–08 season, the new 3rd Liga was established and the Oberliga Nord disbanded, again. The four northern German states were then the only region without an Oberliga and the five Verbandsligen sit right below the Regionalliga Nord, parallel to the two NOFV-Oberligen. At the end of this season, the five winners of the northern Verbandsligen played  with the sixth placed team from the Oberliga Nord for one last spot in the Regionalliga. In the future seasons, promotion for the Hamburg champion will only be available through a set of play-off matches with the league winners from Bremen and Schleswig-Holstein. These three teams will compete for one promotion spot to the Regionalliga.

The Verbandsliga Hamburg however maintained its status as a tier five league, but now under the name of Oberliga Hamburg, reflecting the fact that it has been on the same level as the Oberligas. Breaking with a long tradition, the league now operates with eighteen clubs, not sixteen which it had throughout most of its history.

Position of the Hamburg-Liga in the league system

Founding Members of the Stadtliga Hamburg
The league was formed in 1945 from thirteen clubs from Hamburg, these being:
Hamburger SV
FC St. Pauli
Altona 93
SpVgg Blankenese
Union 03 Altona
SC Concordia Hamburg
Eimsbütteler TV
SC Victoria Hamburg
Post SV Hamburg
Viktoria Wilhelmsburg
TuS Finkenwärder (contemporary spelling)
SV West-Eimsbüttel
FV Wilhelmsburg 09

League champions
The league champions:

bold denotes club gained promotion.
In 1951, the runner–up Lüneburger SK was also promoted.
In 1952, the runner–up Altona 93 was also promoted.
In 1963, the runner–up SC Victoria Hamburg was also promoted.
In 1964, fourth–placed Rasensport Harburg gained promotion instead.
In 1966, the runner–up SC Sperber Hamburg was also promoted.
In 1970, the runner–up SC Sperber Hamburg gained promotion instead.
In 1973, the runner–up SC Concordia Hamburg was also promoted.
In 1974, the runner–up SC Poppenbüttel was also promoted.
In 1984, the runner–up Altona 93 was also promoted.
In 1987, the runner–up 1. SC Norderstedt gained promotion instead.
In 1992, the runner–up VfL 93 Hamburg was also promoted.
In 1994, clubs placed second to eighth also gained promotion.
In 1995, the runner–up Meiendorfer SV was also promoted.
In 1996, the runner–up Rasensport Elmshorn was also promoted.
In 1997, the runner–up ASV Bergedorf 85 was also promoted.
In 1999, the runner–up Eimsbütteler TV was also promoted.
In 2001, the runner–up ASV Bergedorf 85 was also promoted.
In 2002, the runner–up Altona 93 was also promoted.
In 2003, Harburger TB declined promotion; SC Victoria Hamburg, TSV Sasel and Wedeler TSV were promoted instead.
In 2009, the fifth–placed FC St. Pauli II was promoted instead.
In 2013, the fourth-placed Eintracht Norderstedt successfully took part in the promotion round to the Regionalliga as champions FC Elmshorn declined.
In 2014 and 2015, no club applied for a Regionalliga licence from the league or took part in the promotion round.
In 2016, only sixth-placed Altona 93 applied for a Regionalliga licence.
In 2017, third-placed Altona 93 applied for a licence and successfully took part in the promotion round.
In 2020, only the runner-up Teutonia Ottensen applied for a licence and was eventually promoted.
In 2021, there were no champions or promotions after deciding to curtail and annul the season during the COVID-19 pandemic in Germany.

League placings
The complete list of clubs and placings in the league since elevation to Oberliga status (2008–present):

Key

 References 

Sources
 Deutschlands Fußball in Zahlen,  An annual publication with tables and results from the Bundesliga to Verbandsliga/Landesliga. DSFS.
 Kicker Almanach,  The yearbook on German football from Bundesliga to Oberliga, since 1937. Kicker Sports Magazine.
 Die Deutsche Liga-Chronik 1945-2005''  History of German football from 1945 to 2005 in tables. DSFS. 2006.

External links 
 Das deutsche Fussball Archiv  Historic German league tables
 The Hamburg football leagues on Fussball.de  
 The Hamburg Football Association (HFV) 

 
Ham
Football competitions in Hamburg
1945 establishments in Germany